William Gao (born ) is an English actor and musician. He is known for his debut role as Tao Xu in the Netflix series Heartstopper (2022), for which he was nominated for a Children's and Family Emmy Award for Outstanding Supporting Performance.

Gao and his younger sister Olivia Hardy form a music duo called Wasia Project. Their first EP How Can I Pretend? was released in May 2022.

Early life
He is the son of an English father and a Chinese mother who moved to England in her 20s. He attended the Trinity School, where he completed A Levels in Chinese, music and drama in 2022. He took up classical piano at the age of 11 and was a member of Trinity Boys Choir. He joined the National Youth Theatre in May 2019.

Filmography

Television

Theatre

Accolades

References

External links
 
 

2000s births
21st-century English male actors
21st-century English male musicians
British male actors of Chinese descent
English male child actors
English male television actors
English male stage actors
English people of Chinese descent
Living people
National Youth Theatre members
People educated at Trinity School of John Whitgift
People from the London Borough of Croydon
Year of birth uncertain
Place of birth missing (living people)